Carroll House was a racehorse trained in the United Kingdom.

Carroll House may also refer to:

in Australia
Carroll Cottage, Kingaroy, South Burnett Region, Queensland, also known as "Daniel Carroll's House", heritage listed

in the United States
Karsner-Carroll House, Florence, Alabama, listed on the National Register of Historic Places (NRHP)
Dr. Clyde Carroll House, White Mills, Kentucky
Carroll House Hotel, a hotel in North Dakota
Chancellor James P. Carroll House, Allen, South Carolina
Weisiger–Carroll House, Richmond, Virginia
Thomas Carroll House, Washington, D.C.

Carroll House (Clinton, Louisiana), NRHP-listed in East Feliciana Parish
Carroll House Hotel, Fullerton, North Dakota, NRHP-listed
Carroll Mansion, Baltimore, Maryland, NRHP-listed
Carroll Place, St. George, South Carolina, NRHP-listed
Carroll Stagecoach Inn, Oregon, Missouri, NRHP-listed
Carroll Township Hall, Oak Harbor, Ohio, NRHP-listed
Edward Carroll House, Leavenworth, Kansas, NRHP-listed
J. J. Carroll House, Houston, Texas, NRHP-listed
John M. Carroll House, Cave Spring, Georgia, NRHP-listed
Thomas Battle Carroll House, Starkville, Mississippi, NRHP-listed
Thomas Carroll House, Huntington, West Virginia, NRHP-listed
Carroll-Harper House, Cave Spring, Georgia, NRHP-listed
Carroll-Hartshorn House, Reading, Massachusetts, NRHP-listed

See also
Carroll Building (disambiguation)
John Carroll University North Quad Historic District, University Heights, Ohio, NRHP-listed
Carroll-Richardson Grist Mill, Cave Spring, Georgia, NRHP-listed